Sauk River may refer to:

 Sauk River (Michigan),  a tributary of the Coldwater River in Branch County, Michigan, United States
 Sauk River (Minnesota), a tributary of the Mississippi River in Minnesota, United States
 Sauk River (Washington), a tributary of the Skagit River in Washington, United States